Biernatów refers to the following places in Poland:

 Biernatów, Lubusz Voivodeship
 Biernatów, Opole Voivodeship